Allah Ditta (born 21 May 1931) is a former Pakistani racewalker. He competed in the 10 km walk at the 1952 Summer Olympics where he was disqualified in the heats.

References

External links
 

1931 births
Possibly living people
Male racewalkers
Pakistani racewalkers
Olympic athletes of Pakistan
Athletes (track and field) at the 1952 Summer Olympics
Place of birth missing (living people)
Pakistani male athletes
20th-century Pakistani people